Fertitta Entertainment Inc. is a conglomerate and holding company that holds companies and investments owned by Tilman Fertitta. These include Landry's, Inc., the Houston Rockets, and the Golden Nugget casinos. Within the portfolio are many luxury hotels and well known restaurant brands such as Rainforest Café, Del Frisco's, Bubba Gump Shrimp Company, Morton's The Steakhouse, among others. Additionally, the company is the largest shareholder of food delivery app ASAP.

It is headquartered at The Post Oak tower in Uptown Houston. The company has achieved sponsorships and has been granted the naming rights to the Fertitta Center at the University of Houston.

Company portfolio and subsidiaries
Landry's, Inc. (60%)
Houston Rockets (100%)
Golden Nugget Online (60%)
Waitr

Hotels and Casinos

Golden Nugget

 Golden Nugget Atlantic City
 Golden Nugget Biloxi
 Golden Nugget Danville, IL (Future)
 Golden Nugget Lake Charles
 Golden Nugget Las Vegas
 Golden Nugget Laughlin
 Golden Nugget Cripple Creek, CO (Future)

Post Oak Hotels

 Post Oak Hotel and Tower - Houston
 Post Oak Las Vegas (Future)

Other

Blue Water Inn - St. Clair, Michigan
Harbor House Hotel, Galveston, Texas
Huntting Inn - East Hampton, New York
Boardwalk Inn - Kemah, Texas
San Luis Resort - Galveston, Texas
The Villas at San Luis Resort

Post Oak Motor Cars
Fertitta Entertainment owns the luxury car dealership, Post Oak Motor Cars, which is located at the company's headquarters building at The Post Oak Hotel & Tower. It includes a Bentley, Rolls-Royce, Karma, and Bugatti dealership. Upon opening the Bugatti dealership in 2017, it became the first Bugatti dealership in Houston. Post Oak Motor Cars plans a second dealership location in The Woodlands, Texas. The dealership also provides used cars of brands besides the brands it's licensed to sell. For select guests, the Post Oak Motor Cars provides services to Fertitta's hotels in the Houston area and other businesses it's partnered with. The company is home to Post Oak Power, an exclusive luxury car club that united owners in the Houston area.

Houston Rockets
On September 4, 2017, he agreed to purchase the Rockets from Leslie Alexander, pending league approval, for an NBA record $2.2 billion. On October 6, 2017, Fertitta was approved by the NBA to own the Houston Rockets.

References

External links
 

Holding companies of the United States
Companies based in Houston